The Hartford Jr. Wolfpack were a junior ice hockey team that most recently played in the United States Premier Hockey League (USPHL). The team played their home games at the Champions Skating Center located in Cromwell, Connecticut. From 2003 to 2017, the Jr. Wolfpack were members of the Eastern Hockey League (EHL) and its predecessor, the Atlantic Junior Hockey League (AJHL), while sanctioned as a Tier III junior team by USA Hockey before it joined the unsanctioned USPHL. The team was removed from the USPHL schedule at the beginning of the 2019–20 season.

The organization also fielded a developmental team in the USPHL Elite Division as well as youth hockey select teams at the Midget U18, Midget 16U, Bantam, Peewee, and Squirt and other various levels. The Elite team played in the former Tier III Junior B level Metropolitan Junior Hockey League until 2016.

From the 2010–11 to the 2012–13 season the Jr. Wolfpack changed their moniker from Hartford to Connecticut.

Season-by-season records

Alumni   
The Jr. Wolfpack have produced a number of alumni playing in higher levels of junior hockey, NCAA Division I, Division III college and professional programs, including:
 Rob Bellamy (drafted  by the Philadelphia Flyers in the 2004 NHL Entry Draft) - Adirondack Phantoms (AHL)
 Kurt Reynolds - Basingstoke Bison (EIHL)
 Jordan Samuels-Thomas (drafted by the Atlanta Thrashers in the 2009 NHL Entry Draft) - Ontario Reign (AHL)

References

External links
 Hartford Jr. Wolfpack Webpage

Ice hockey teams in Connecticut
2003 establishments in Connecticut
Ice hockey clubs established in 2003